The Messoyakha is a river in Yamalo-Nenets Autonomous Okrug, Russia. It drains into the Taz Estuary.

References

External links 
 Article in Great Soviet Encyclopedia

Rivers of Yamalo-Nenets Autonomous Okrug
Drainage basins of the Kara Sea